My Colouring Book is the eleventh studio album released by Swedish singer-songwriter Agnetha Fältskog. It is her fourth album recorded in English and was her first album release for 17 years, and was well received by ABBA fans, as well as the general music press, with renditions of songs which she had listened to during her teen years in the 1960s.

The singles from the album were "If I Thought You'd Ever Change Your Mind" (#11 in the UK) and "When You Walk in the Room" (UK #34), though "Sometimes When I'm Dreaming" was issued in Sweden as a promo-only single. The album reached #12 in the UK, her highest-charting album there until May 2013, when she reached #6 with her album "A".

Reception
It was announced that around 500,000 copies of the album were sold worldwide. During 2004, the album went silver in the UK for sales of over 60,000, while in Fältskog's home country of Sweden, during its first week of release, a high 64,000 copies were sold. My Colouring Book also reached #6 in Germany in May 2004.

Track listing
"My Colouring Book" (Fred Ebb, John Kander) – 3:27
"When You Walk in the Room" (Jackie DeShannon) – 3:36
"If I Thought You'd Ever Change Your Mind" (John Cameron) – 3:15
"Sealed with a Kiss" (Gary Geld, Peter Udell) – 2:34
"Love Me with All Your Heart" (Rafael Gaston Perez, Carlos Albert Martinoli) – 3:11
"Fly Me to the Moon" (Bart Howard) – 2:49
"Past, Present and Future" (Arthur Butler, Jerry Leiber, George Francis Morton) – 3:12
"A Fool Am I" (Flavio Carraresi, Alberto Testa, Peter Callander) (originally Dimmelo parlami by Fabrizio Ferretti) – 3:32
"I Can't Reach Your Heart" (Ted Murry, Benny Davis) – 	2:39
"Sometimes When I'm Dreaming" (Mike Batt) – 	3:15
"The End of the World" (Arthur Kent, Sylvia Dee) – 2:35
"Remember Me" (Chris Andrews) – 3:05
"What Now My Love" (Gilbert Bécaud, Pierre Delanoë, Carl Sigman) – 4:49

Personnel 
According to the European CD issue.

Musicians
 Agnetha Fältskog – lead vocals, backing vocals (1, 3, 4, 5, 9, 11, 13), vocal arrangements (3, 4, 5)
 Anders Neglin – Rhodes piano (1, 6, 9, 12), harmonium (1, 4), orchestra bells (1, 2, 5, 9, 11), string arrangements and conductor (1-10, 13), grand piano (2-13), Hammond B3 organ (2, 4, 12, 13), horn arrangements (2, 3, 7, 8, 11, 12, 13), keyboards (3, 5, 8, 13), castanets (4), Wurlitzer electric piano (5, 11, 12), violin arrangements (7), Farfisa organ (11)
 Magnus Bengtsson – guitars (1, 2, 5, 12, 13), acoustic guitar (6), mandolin (12)
 Lasse Wellander – acoustic guitar (1, 6, 8, 9, 12), guitars (3, 5, 7, 13), electric guitar (8)
 Johan Lindström – pedal steel guitar (1, 5, 6, 13), guitars (4, 7, 11, 13), Omnichord (7), electric guitar (8), Vox Jaguar organ (11)
 Johan Granström – acoustic bass (1, 6-9), bass guitar (2-5, 11, 12, 13)
 Dan Strömkvist – drums (1-9, 11, 12, 13), percussion (1-9, 12, 13), vocal arrangements (1, 3, 4, 5, 8, 12), BGV arrangements (2), additional keyboards (4, 8, 9), horn arrangements (11)
 Jörgen Stenberg – bass drum (6), additional orchestra percussion (8)
 Wojtek Goral – tenor saxophone (2, 11, 12), bass clarinet (2), baritone saxophone (11, 12)
 Anders Wiborg – bass trombone (2, 8, 12)
 Per Larsson – trombone (2, 8, 12)
 Urban Wiborg – trombone (2, 8, 12)
 Joakim Agnas – trumpet (2, 8, 12)
 Leif Lindvall – trumpet (2, 8, 12)
 Jesper Harryson – oboe (3)
 Johan Ahlin – French horn (3, 7, 8, 13)
 Magnus Franzén – French horn (3, 7, 8, 13)
 Christian Bergqvist – violin solo (7)
 Svea Strings – strings (1-10, 13)
 Andreas Hansson – string conductor (1-10, 13)
 Christina Wirdegren-Alin – string contractor (1-10, 13)
 Karl-Johan Ankarblom – music copyist (1-10, 13)
 Johanna Nyström – backing vocals (1, 3, 5, 8)
 Patrik Lundström – backing vocals (2, 4, 8)
 Sofia Tretow – backing vocals (2, 5, 7) 
 Linda Ulvaeus – backing vocals (2, 5, 7)
 Sarah Dawn Finer – backing vocals (4, 5, 8, 12)
 Britta Bergström – backing vocals (5, 8)
 Carl-Magnus Carlsson – backing vocals (12)

Production
 Agnetha Fältskog – producer, arrangements, concept, liner notes 
 Anders Neglin – producer, arrangements
 Dan Strömkvist – producer, arrangements, engineer
 Janne Hansson – engineer
 Alar Suurna – mixing
 Christofer Stannow – mastering
 Jimmy Backius – photography
 Destrito – design

Charts

Weekly charts

Year-end charts

Certifications and sales

References

External links 
 Official Website of Agnetha Fältskog

2004 albums
Agnetha Fältskog albums
Warner Music Group albums
Covers albums